Ghent is a census-designated place (CDP) in the town of Ghent in Columbia County, New York, United States. The population of the CDP was 564 at the 2010 census, out of a total town population of 5,402.

The community is located northeast of the city of Hudson.

Ghent was originally the site of a Mahican Native American village known as Squampamock, Scom-pa-muck or Squampanoc.

Geography
Ghent is located in the northeast part of the town of Ghent at  (42.329228, -73.616596), bordered on the north by Kline Kill, a stream which flows north to Kinderhook Creek, a tributary of the Hudson River.

New York State Route 66 passes through Ghent, leading southwest  to Hudson, the Columbia County seat, and northeast  to Chatham.

Demographics

At the 2000 census, there were 586 people, 238 households and 170 families residing in the CDP. The population density was 380.6 per square mile (146.9/km2). There were 250 housing units at an average density of 162.4/sq mi (62.7/km2). The racial makeup of the CDP was 97.95% White, 1.02% Black or African American, 0.51% Native American, 0.17% Asian, and 0.34% from two or more races. Hispanic or Latino of any race were 1.02% of the population.

There were 238 households, of which 29.8% had children under the age of 18 living with them, 59.7% were married couples living together, 9.7% had a female householder with no husband present, and 28.2% were non-families. 24.4% of all households were made up of individuals, and 12.2% had someone living alone who was 65 years of age or older. The average household size was 2.45 and the average family size was 2.89.

22.4% of the population were under the age of 18, 6.8% from 18 to 24, 28.8% from 25 to 44, 26.6% from 45 to 64, and 15.4% who were 65 years of age or older. The median age was 40 years. For every 100 females, there were 96.0 males. For every 100 females age 18 and over, there were 97.8 males.

The median household income was $51,538 and the median family income was $55,543. Males had a median income of $35,000 and females $20,750. The per capita income for the CDP was $19,471. None of the families and 3.5% of the population were living below the poverty line, including no under eighteens and 18.5% of those over 64.

References

Census-designated places in New York (state)
Census-designated places in Columbia County, New York